Wanneroo Raceway, currently known as CARCO.com.au Raceway for naming rights reasons, is a  motorsport circuit located in Neerabup, approximately  north of Perth in Western Australia. It was built by the WA Sporting Car Club.

The circuit was originally known as Wanneroo Park and the first race meet took place in March 1969. Initially the major race per year was a 6-hour Le Mans style race for sedans and sports cars known as the Six Hour Le Mans. However, as interest dulled in that event, production car racing took over as the major race type. In 1979, the Australian Grand Prix was held for the first and so far only time at Wanneroo Raceway which coincided with the opening of the new pits and paddock area to the west of the circuit. The Grand Prix was won by South Australian Johnnie Walker driving a Lola T332 Formula 5000. Walker was the last driver to win the AGP driving a Formula 5000.

In 1992, it was decided that a short circuit would be constructed by linking Turn 5 on the current circuit to the back straight forming a new  circuit. This extension was funded by prominent West Australian motorsport identity Alf Barbagallo and hence the circuit name was changed to Barbagallo Raceway. The short circuit allowed for an increase in the types of racing including the inclusion of truck racing and also allowed events to be run at night.

The circuit was completely resurfaced in 2004 and this saw almost all lap records broken in the first few months of 2004. Due to the sandy nature of the area the circuit slowly became more and more abrasive over time and was considered one of the toughest on tyres in the country.

The circuit was resurfaced again in early 2019. The circuit was renamed Wanneroo Raceway in 2020, however its name was changed as CARCO.com.au Raceway from August 2022 to November 2025.

Events

The track holds a number of major race meets each year, with the biggest being a round of the Supercars Championship called the Perth SuperSprint. This is one of the biggest sporting events in Western Australia each year with over 50,000 people attending the 3-day event.

The circuit offers patrons drift racing as an occasional spectacle.

The circuit hosted the inaugural Australian Festival of Speed in 2010. Formula One team Red Bull Racing and driver Mark Webber attended for a demonstration. The festival never returned to the circuit, having bankrupted the owners.

The circuit also hosts a number of motorcycle racing and training events, including the WA State Championships for Superbikes, Supersport and Sidecars – along with a number of support classes.

Upgrades
Due to the removal of the circuit from the V8 Supercar calendar for 2010 season, the state government considered upgrading the track to improve the quality of the track and its facilities.

Many options were considered, which included extending the track to the north which would roughly double the length of the circuit, there were also alternative extension plans which were smaller. The widening of the track was also addressed, which would be needed to extend the track for safety regulations. The plan of the track extension was expensive if all aspects of the plan were considered, this would see this major upgrade of the circuit be postponed until the necessary upgrades are completed.

On 18 July 2011, the track's control tower was torn down, beginning the first stage of upgrades that saw the track widened, and a new pit facility built in the centre of the circuit, with connecting bridge. Improved lighting and safety barriers, as well as upgrades to facilities and buildings within the circuit formed part of the project.

Following a number of deaths Motorcycle Racing was banned from Wanneroo Raceway in November 2016 until a number of safety upgrades could be implemented. In June 2016 the WA government released the "Wanneroo Safety Enhancement Options Identification Assessment", also known as the Hall Report, recommending changes to the circuit to allow motorbike racing to return. These upgrades included the addition of a "Bus Stop" Style turn at turn 3, a barrier wall through the infield area between turns 4 and the back straight and some other minor improvements, and were added to the circuit in January 2017. The track was relicenced by Motorcycling Australia in March 2019, allowing racing to return.

Touring Car round winners

Wanneroo Raceway has held rounds of the Australian Touring Car Championship since 1973. The circuit was left off the calendar from 1974 to 1977 and again in 2010.

Craig Lowndes has won the most ATCC / V8 Supercars rounds at the circuit with six wins. The most successful touring car team at Wanneroo is the Dick Johnson Racing with seven wins.

The first ATCC race held at the circuit in 1973 was won by Allan Moffat driving a Ford XY Falcon GTHO Phase III for the Ford Works Team.

Lap records

As of May 2022, the official race lap records at Wanneroo Raceway are listed as:

Oral history 

 John Hurney
 Patsie McCrakan

Notes

References

External links

 CARCO.com.au Raceway

 
Motorsport venues in Western Australia
Supercars Championship circuits
Australian Grand Prix
Neerabup, Western Australia
Sports venues completed in 1969
1969 establishments in Australia